Empress Renxiaowen (仁孝文皇后; 5 March 1362 – 6 August 1407), of the Xu clan, was the empress consort to the Yongle Emperor and the third empress of China's Ming dynasty. She was well educated, compiling bibliographies of virtuous women, an activity connected with court politics.

Biography
Lady Xu was born in 1362, as the eldest daughter of Xu Da and Lady Xie (謝氏), second daughter of Xie Zaixing (謝再興). She had four brothers—Xu Huizu (徐輝祖), Xu Tianfu (徐添福), Xu Yingxu (徐膺緒), and Xu Zengshou (徐增壽)—and two younger sisters, who were the wives of Zhu Gui, Prince Jian of Dai (thirteenth son of the Hongwu Emperor) and Zhu Ying, Prince Hui of An (twenty-second son of the Hongwu Emperor).  On 17 February 1376, she married the Zhu Di, Prince of Yan, the Hongwu Emperor's fourth son. After Zhu Di ascended the throne as the Yongle Emperor on 17 July 1402, Consort Xu, as his primary wife, was created empress in December 1402.

A devout Buddhist, Xu is the first person credited with transcribing a Buddhist sutra from a dream revelation. The work is entitled Da Ming Ren xiao Huang hou meng kan Fo Shuo di yi xi yu da gong de jing (The sutra of great merit of the foremost rarity spoken by the Buddha which the Renxiao empress of the great Ming received in a dream). In her introduction to the sutra, the empress wrote that one night after meditating and burning incense, Guanyin appeared to her as if in a dream, and took her to a holy realm where the sutra was revealed to her in order to save her from disaster. After reading the sutra three times, she was able to memorize it and recall it perfectly upon awakening and writing it down.  The sutra conveys conventional Mahayana philosophies, and the mantras for chanting were typical of Tibetan Buddhist practices.

Titles
During the reign of the Hongwu Emperor (r. 1368–1398):
Lady Xu (徐氏; from 5 March 1362)
Princess consort of Yan (燕王妃; from 1376)
During the reign of the Yongle Emperor (r. 1402–1424):
Empress (皇后; from 17 July 1402)
Empress Renxiao (仁孝文皇后; from 1407)
Empress Rénxiào Cíyì Chéngmíng Zhuāngxiàn Pèitiān Qíshèng Wēn (仁孝慈懿誠明庄獻配天齊聖文皇后; from 1424)

Issue
 As Princess consort of Yan:
 Zhu Gaochi, the Hongxi Emperor (洪熙帝 朱高熾; 16 August 1378 – 29 May 1425), the Yongle Emperor's first son
 Zhu Gaoxu, Prince of Han (漢王 朱高煦; 30 December 1380 – 6 October 1426), the Yongle Emperor's second son
 Zhu Gaosui, Prince Jian of Zhao (趙簡王 朱高燧; 19 January 1383 – 5 October 1431), the Yongle Emperor's third son
 Princess Yong'an (永安公主; 1377–1417), personal name Yuying (玉英), the Yongle Emperor's first daughter
 Married Yuan Rong (袁容), and  had issue (one son, three daughters)
 Princess Yong'ping (永平公主; 1379 – 22 April 1444), the Yongle Emperor's second daughter
 Married Li Rang (李讓),  and had issue (one son)
 Princess Ancheng (安成公主; 1384 – 16 September 1443), the Yongle Emperor's third daughter
 Married Song Hu (宋琥) in 1402, and had issue (one son)
 Princess Xianning (咸寧公主; 1385 – 27 July 1440), the Yongle Emperor's fourth daughter
 Married Song Ying (宋瑛; d. 1449) in 1403, and had issue (one son)

Ancestry

References

1362 births
1407 deaths
14th-century Chinese women
15th-century Chinese women
15th-century Chinese women writers
15th-century Chinese writers
Women encyclopedists
Ming dynasty Buddhists
Ming dynasty empresses
Consorts of the Yongle Emperor
14th-century Chinese people
15th-century Chinese people
People from Fengyang